The Cleveland Stock Exchange was a stock exchange in Cleveland, Ohio, U.S.

History
The Cleveland Stock Exchange was established in 1899, and began operations on April 16, 1900 at the Williamson Building (today the location of the 200 Public Square skyscraper). It later moved to the Union Trust Building on Euclid Avenue.  In October 1949, its members voted to dissolve and join the Midwest Stock Exchange.

See also
List of former stock exchanges in the Americas
List of stock exchange mergers in the Americas

References

External links
Finding aid for the Cleveland Stock Exchange Records at the Western Reserve Historical Society

Former stock exchanges in the United States
Self-regulatory organizations in the United States
Companies based in Cleveland
Financial services companies established in 1899
1899 establishments in Ohio
Economy of Cleveland
Financial services companies disestablished in 1949
1949 disestablishments in Ohio
1949 mergers and acquisitions